Last Action Hero is a 1993 American fantasy action comedy film directed and produced by John McTiernan and co-written by Shane Black and David Arnott. It is a satire of the action genre and associated clichés, containing several parodies of action films in the form of films within the film. The film stars Arnold Schwarzenegger as Jack Slater, a Los Angeles police detective within the Jack Slater action film franchise, while Austin O'Brien co-stars as Danny Madigan, a boy magically transported into the Slater universe, and Charles Dance as Mr. Benedict, a ruthless assassin from the Slater universe who escapes to the real world. Schwarzenegger also served as the film's executive producer and plays himself as the actor portraying Jack Slater.

Last Action Hero failed to meet the studio's expectations at the box office, and was both a critical and commercial disappointment. The film later found commercial success with its VHS release, establishing itself as a cult classic. The film was also Art Carney's last appearance in a motion picture before his death in 2003.

Plot

Danny Madigan is a ten-year-old boy living in a crime-ridden area of New York City with his widowed mother, Irene. Following his father's death, Danny takes comfort in watching action movies, especially a series featuring the indestructible Los Angeles cop, Jack Slater, at his local movie theater owned by Nick, who also acts as the projectionist. Nick gives Danny a golden ticket once owned by Harry Houdini, to see an early screening of Jack Slater IV before its official release.

During the film, the ticket stub (counterfoil) magically transports Danny into the fictional world, interrupting Slater in the middle of a car chase. After escaping from their pursuers, Slater takes Danny to the LAPD headquarters, where Danny points out evidence of the fictional nature of Slater's world, such as the presence of numerous women and a cartoon cat detective named Whiskers, and says that Slater's friend John Practice should not be trusted as he "killed Mozart" (since he is played by the same actor as Antonio Salieri in Amadeus). Though Slater dismisses all of this as part of Danny's wild imagination, Slater's supervisor, Lieutenant Dekker, assigns Danny as his new partner, and instructs them to investigate criminal activities related to mafia boss Tony Vivaldi.

Danny guides Slater to Vivaldi's mansion, recognizing its location from the start of the movie. There, they meet Vivaldi's henchman, Mr. Benedict. Danny later claims that Vivaldi and Benedict were the ones who killed Slater's second cousin, but Slater has no evidence, and they are forced to leave; however, Benedict is curious as to how Danny knew, and he and several hired guns follow Slater and Danny back to Slater's home. There, Slater, his daughter Whitney, and Danny thwart the attack, though Benedict ends up getting the ticket stub. He discovers its ability to transport him out of the film and into the real world.

Slater deduces Vivaldi's plan to murder the rival mob by releasing a lethal gas during a funeral atop a skyscraper. He and Danny go to stop it, but are waylaid by Practice, who reveals that Danny was right: he is working for Vivaldi. Whiskers kills Practice, saving Slater and Danny, and the two manage to prevent any deaths from the gas release. Learning that Vivaldi's plan has failed, Benedict kills him, and he uses the stub to escape into the real world, pursued by Slater and Danny.

Slater becomes despondent upon learning the truth, as well as his mortality in the real world, but cheers up after spending some time with Irene. Meanwhile, Benedict devises a plan to kill the actor portraying Slater in the movie, Arnold Schwarzenegger, after which he can bring other villains from other movies into the real world and take over. To help, Benedict brings the Ripper, the villain of Jack Slater III, to the premiere of Jack Slater IV to assassinate Schwarzenegger. Danny and Slater learn of this and race there. Slater saves Schwarzenegger and kills the Ripper. Benedict appears and shoots Slater, critically injuring him. Danny subdues and disarms Benedict, allowing Slater to grab his revolver and shoot Benedict in his explosive glass eye, killing him; however, the blast causes the stub to be lost. With Slater losing blood, Danny knows that the only way to save him is to return him to the fictional world, where he is indestructible.

The ticket stub falls in front of a theater playing the film The Seventh Seal, where The Figure of Death emerges from the screen. Death appears before Danny and Slater after they arrive at the theater in a hurry. Danny holds Death at gunpoint, but Death clarifies he was simply curious: Jack Slater is missing from his lists of when people will die, and Danny is slated to die as a grandfather. Death then suggests searching for the other half of the ticket. Danny finds it and is able to take Slater back into his movie, where his wounds instantly heal. Danny returns to the real world before the portal closes. A recovered Slater then enthusiastically embraces the true nature of his reality when he talks to Dekker about his new plan, appreciating the differences between the two worlds. Danny and Nick share a heartfelt moment reminiscing their past, while Slater drives away on the screen, waving goodbye.

Cast
 Arnold Schwarzenegger as Detective Jack Slater, a fictional LAPD officer who serves as the film's protagonist. Schwarzenegger also portrays Hamlet and a fictionalized version of himself.
 Austin O'Brien as Danny Madigan, a ten-year-old boy who is a big fan of the Slater franchise and the film's overarching protagonist.
 Charles Dance as Mr. Benedict, Vivaldi's right-hand man, a supporting antagonist in Jack Slater IV who becomes the film's hidden main antagonist.
 Robert Prosky as Nick the projectionist
 Tom Noonan as the Ripper (the main antagonist of Jack Slater III). He also appeared as himself at the Jack Slater IV premiere.
 Frank McRae as Lieutenant Dekker, Slater's immediate and ill-tempered supervisor, who is always screaming at him.
 Anthony Quinn as Tony Vivaldi, the main antagonist of Jack Slater IV until Danny's interference changes events. A running gag with him is his frequent butchering of common phrases.
 Bridgette Wilson as Whitney Slater (Jack's daughter) and Meredith Caprice, the actress who plays her in the Slater films
 F. Murray Abraham as John Practice, Jack's friend, revealed to be a traitor. Danny says not to trust him, saying he killed Mozart, referring to Abraham's Oscar-winning role as Antonio Salieri in Amadeus.
 Mercedes Ruehl as Irene Madigan, Danny's mother
 Art Carney as Frank Slater, Jack's second cousin; this was Carney's final film role
 Professor Toru Tanaka as Vivaldi and Benedict's bodyguard (the Tough Asian Man).
 Ryan Todd as Andrew Slater, Jack's son, who was killed in Jack Slater III by the Ripper.
 Jeffrey Braer as Skeezy
 Bobbie Brown as Video Babe (credited as Bobbi Brown Lane)

Cameo appearances
 Franco Columbu's name appears during the opening credits as director of Jack Slater IV. Columbu was a fellow bodybuilder and a close friend of Schwarzenegger.
 Tina Turner appears at the climax of Jack Slater III as the mayor of Los Angeles.
 Sharon Stone and Robert Patrick appear outside the front door of LAPD as Catherine Tramell (from Basic Instinct) and the T-1000 (from Terminator 2: Judgment Day), respectively. Stone and Patrick had earlier co-starred with  Schwarzenegger in Total Recall and Terminator 2, respectively.
 Mike Muscat appears as a cop in the LAPD headquarters. Muscat previously appeared with Schwarzenegger as Moshier in Terminator 2: Judgment Day, and was also Edward Furlong's acting coach for the same film.
 Veteran stuntmen Al Leong, Henry Kingi and Sven-Ole Thorsen appear as Vivaldi's henchmen in the car chase
 Sylvester Stallone as the Terminator is on a poster promoting Terminator 2: Judgment Day. This refers to Schwarzenegger's friendly rivalry with Stallone.
 Angie Everhart as a video store clerk
 During the premiere of Jack Slater IV in the real world, several celebrities appear as themselves. These include Schwarzenegger's then-wife Maria Shriver, Little Richard, Entertainment Tonight host Leeza Gibbons, Jim Belushi (who starred with Schwarzenegger in Red Heat and later Jingle All the Way), Damon Wayans, Chevy Chase, Melvin Van Peebles, entertainment reporter Chris Connelly, and Jean-Claude Van Damme (who worked with John McTiernan on the Schwarzenegger film Predator as the original Predator before dropping out, and later co-starred with Schwarzenegger in The Expendables 2).
 As Jack and Danny enter the movie theater to find Arnold Schwarzenegger, MC Hammer asks Slater about a deal to do the Jack Slater V soundtrack.
 Michael V. Gazzo as crime boss Torelli
 Wilson Phillips appears singing during the funeral scene
 Ian McKellen appears as Death, emerging via the ticket stub's magic from Ingmar Bergman's film The Seventh Seal (in which the role was originally played by Bengt Ekerot).
 Danny DeVito is the voice of Whiskers, the cartoon cat police detective. He and Schwarzenegger played twin brothers in 1988's Twins and co-starred again in 1994's Junior. DeVito was uncredited for the role.
 Colleen Camp as Officer Ratcliff, the cop who retaliates when harassed by Whiskers in the police station
 Joan Plowright is the English teacher who shows her class the 1948 film adaptation of Hamlet, which starred and was directed by Plowright's husband Laurence Olivier.

Production

Development and writing
Last Action Hero was an original screenplay by Zak Penn and Adam Leff, meant to parody typical action-film screenplays of writers such as Shane Black. Penn himself noted that the studio ironically then had Black rewrite the script. The original screenplay differs heavily from the finished film and is widely available to read online. Although it was still a parody of Hollywood action films, it was set almost entirely in the film world and focused largely on the futile cycle of violence displayed by the hero and the effect it had on people around him. Due to the radical changes, Penn and Leff were eventually credited with the story of the film, but not the screenplay.

Several script doctors did uncredited work on the script, including Carrie Fisher, Larry Ferguson, and William Goldman. Penn and Leff disliked various parts of the final film, including the idea of a magic golden ticket. In their draft, the story would not explain how Danny got transported into the film world.

Schwarzenegger received a salary of $15 million for his role in the film.

Some scenes were filmed in a dome adjacent to the RMS Queen Mary in Long Beach, California. The exterior of the film's Pandora Theater was the Empire Theater on 42nd Street in New York. The interiors were filmed at the Orpheum Theatre in Los Angeles.

Years after its release, the film was the subject of a scathing chapter called "How They Built The Bomb", in the Nancy Griffin book Hit and Run which detailed misadventures at Sony Pictures in the early to mid-1990s. Among the details presented in this chapter were:

 Universal moved Jurassic Park to June 11, 1993, well after Sony had decided on a June 18 release date for Last Action Hero.
 The movie was reportedly the first to have an advertisement placed on a space-going rocket. 
 The film was capsized by a wave of negative publicity after a rough cut of it was shown to a preview audience in May. Sony then destroyed the test cards and the word-of-mouth proved to be catastrophic for the film.
 The shooting and editing schedule were so demanding and so close to the June 18 release date that after the movie's release, a source close to the film said that they "shouldn't have had Siskel and Ebert telling us the movie is 10 minutes too long".
 Sony was even more humiliated the weekend after the film opened, when the movie lost 47% of its opening-weekend audience and had TriStar's Sleepless in Seattle open as the number-two movie at the box office.
 The final declared financial loss for the film was $26 million.
 Last Action Hero was the first film to be released using Sony Dynamic Digital Sound, but only a few theaters were set up for the new format, and many of those experienced technical problems with the new system. Insiders at Paramount reportedly referred to it as "Still Doesn't Do Shit".

Music

The film was scored by composer Michael Kamen and peaked at No. 7 on The Billboard 200 chart.  The album, which was positively received by active rock radio outlets, was certified platinum on August 24, 1993.

Certifications

Release

Theatrical
At the time of its release, the film was billed as "the next great summer action movie" and many movie insiders predicted it would be a huge blockbuster, especially following the success of Schwarzenegger's previous film, Terminator 2: Judgment Day. The film premiered in Westwood, Los Angeles on June 13, 1993, and entered general release in the United States five days later.

Home media
Last Action Hero was released on VHS and LaserDisc by Columbia TriStar Home Video on August 29, 1994, and on DVD on October 7, 1997. On February 3, 2009, Last Action Hero was reissued on DVD by Sony Pictures Home Entertainment in a double-feature set with the 1986 film Iron Eagle. It was released on the high-definition Blu-ray Disc format on January 12, 2010. The film double-featured with Hudson Hawk on Blu-ray and released by Umbrella Entertainment on September 4, 2019, in Australia only. An Ultra HD Blu-ray restored version was released on May 18, 2021, and featured a director's commentary track, deleted scenes, an alternative ending, and the original theatrical trailer, all in 4K. The film was re-released with Cliffhanger in a 2-Movie Collection Blu-ray pack on November 2, 2021.

Reception

Box office
The film grossed approximately $1.1 million in previews on the evening of Thursday, June 17, 1993, and opened at number two at the US box office, behind Jurassic Parks second weekend, grossing $14.2 million on its opening weekend from 2,306 theaters. It ended its run with $50,016,394 in the United States and Canada. The film was released in the United Kingdom on July 30, 1993, on 266 screens and again opened at number two behind Jurassic Park (on 435 screens) with a gross of $1.34 million for the weekend. In France it opened at number one with a gross of 21 million French franc ($3.6 million) in its opening week.  It grossed $87,202,095 overseas, for a worldwide total of $137,298,489. In an A&E biography of Schwarzenegger, the actor (who was also the film's executive producer) says that the film could have done better if not for bad timing, since it came out a week after Jurassic Park which went on to break box-office records as one of the top-grossing films of all time.

Schwarzenegger states that he tried to persuade his coproducers to postpone the film's June 18 release in the United States by four weeks, but they turned a deaf ear on the grounds that the film would have lost millions of dollars in revenue for every weekend of the summer it ended up missing, also fearing that delaying the release would create negative publicity. He told the authors of Hit And Run that while everyone involved with the production had given their best effort, their attempt to appeal to both action and comedy fans resulted in a film that appealed to neither audience and ultimately succumbed to heavy competition.

Critical response

Last Action Hero received mixed reviews from critics. On Rotten Tomatoes, the film has an approval rating of 39% based on 51 reviews and an average rating of 5.1/10. The site's critical consensus reads, "Last Action Hero has most of the right ingredients for a big-budget action spoof, but its scattershot tone and uneven structure only add up to a confused, chaotic mess." On Metacritic, the film has a weighted average score of 44 out of 100 based on 19 critics, indicating "mixed or average reviews". Audiences polled by CinemaScore gave the film an average grade of "C+" on an A+ to F scale.

Roger Ebert gave the film 2.5 stars out of 4, writing that despite some entertaining moments, Last Action Hero "plays more like a bright idea than like a movie that was thought through. It doesn't evoke the mystery of the barrier between audience and screen the way Woody Allen did in The Purple Rose of Cairo, and a lot of the time it simply seems to be standing around commenting on itself." 
Vincent Canby likened the film to "a two-hour Saturday Night Live sketch" and called it "something of a mess, but a frequently enjoyable one".
Owen Gleiberman of Entertainment Weekly wrote: "Last Action Hero makes such a strenuous show of winking at the audience (and itself) that it seems to be celebrating nothing so much as its own awfulness. In a sense, the movie's incipient commercial failure completes it aesthetically." 
Variety called it "a joyless, soulless machine of a movie, an $80 million-plus mishmash of fantasy, industry in-jokes, self-referential parody, film-buff gags and too-big action set-pieces." Halliwell's Film Guide described it as "a film that tries to have it both ways, simultaneously mocking and celebrating the conventions of action movies, which leaves audiences, as well as the actors and director, in a state of bewildered confusion". John Ferguson of Radio Times was more positive, awarding it four stars out of five and stating, "An Arnold Schwarzenegger backlash had been on the cards for some time and when this extravaganza was released the knives were well and truly out. It was actually all a little unfair, because this is a smart, funny blockbuster [...] Schwarzenegger has rarely been better and he is backed up by a never-ending stream of star names in cameo roles [...] And, although McTiernan has fun spoofing the conventions of the action genre, he still manages to slip in some spectacular set pieces."

About the film's failure and critical response, John McTiernan said: Initially, it was a wonderful Cinderella story with a nine-year-old boy. We had a pretty good script by Bill Goldman, charming. And this ludicrous hype machine got hold of it, and it got buried under bullshit. It was so overwhelmed with baggage. And then it was whipped out unedited, practically assembled right out of the camera. It was in the theater five or six weeks after I finished shooting. It was kamikaze, stupid, no good reason for it. And then to open the week after Jurassic Park--God! To get to the depth of bad judgment involved in that you'd need a snorkel. Schwarzenegger blamed the film's poor performance on bad press and the election of Democratic president Bill Clinton, which he said influenced audiences to see 1980s action film stars as lowbrow. In 2017, he said streaming services gave the film its chance to reach new audiences unencumbered by the bad press.
Shane Black was very critical of the movie: "It was a mess. There was a movie in there, struggling to emerge, which would have pleased me. But what they’d made was a jarring, random collection of scenes."

Accolades
The film was nominated for six Golden Raspberry Awards: Worst Picture, Worst Actor (Arnold Schwarzenegger), Worst Director, Worst Screenplay, Worst New Star (Austin O'Brien), and Worst Original Song ("Big Gun"), but it did not win any. At the 1993 Stinkers Bad Movie Awards, the film received two nominations without wins: Worst Picture and Worst Actor (Schwarzenegger).
The film was also nominated for six Saturn Awards for Best Fantasy Film, Best Actor, Best Director, Best Performance by a Young Actor, Best Costume, and Best Special Effects.

Video games
A video game based on the film of the same name was released in 1994 on video game consoles, and the themed-pinball machine was released in 1993 by Data East and digitally re-released on The Pinball Arcade and its spin-off Stern Pinball Arcade in 2016.

Potential sequel
In October 2019, Schwarzenegger revealed that he was willing to star in True Lies 2 and Last Action Hero 2, possible legacy sequels to the two films of his 90s action roles.

See also 
 List of American films of 1993
 Story within a story
 List of 8 channel SDDS films
 List of films featuring fictional films

References

Further reading

External links
Official website
 September 9, 1991 first draft script by Zak Penn and Adam Leff at Awesomefilm
 October 10, 1992 composite draft script by Zak Penn and Adam Leff, current draft by Shane Black and David Arnott, doctored by William Goldman at Awesomefilm
 

1993 films
1993 action comedy films
1993 fantasy films
1990s buddy comedy films
1990s buddy cop films
American fantasy comedy films
American buddy cop films
American fantasy films
American parody films
American comedy films
American action comedy films
American action adventure films
American buddy comedy films
American films with live action and animation
1990s children's comedy films
American police detective films
Metafictional works
Columbia Pictures films
Films about friendship
Fictional portrayals of the Los Angeles Police Department
Films set in Los Angeles
Films set in New York City
Films shot in Los Angeles
Films shot in New York City
Films directed by John McTiernan
Films with screenplays by Zak Penn
Films with screenplays by Shane Black
Films scored by Michael Kamen
Films about personifications of death
Films set in a movie theatre
Films produced by John McTiernan
Films with screenplays by David Arnott
American children's comedy films
American children's fantasy films
1990s English-language films
1990s American films